Alastair Martin Gordon Scott (born 31 March 1966) is a former English cricketer. Scott was a right-handed batsman who bowled left-arm medium pace. He was born in Guildford, Surrey.

While studying at the University of Cambridge, Scott made his first-class debut for Cambridge University against Essex at Fenner's. He made eight further first-class appearances for the university in that season, taking 25 wickets at an average of 35.16, with best figures of 5/68, which came against Nottinghamshire. He was selected to play in the Combined Universities team to play in the 1985 Benson & Hedges Cup, making his List A debut in the tournament against Surrey and making three further appearances in the competition. In 1986, he made seven first-class appearances for the university, taking 18 wickets at an average of 45.22, with best figures of 4/100. He also made a single first-class appearance each for a combined Oxford and Cambridge Universities team against the touring New Zealanders and for Sussex against Worcestershire in the County Championship. He also played in the 1986 Benson & Hedges Cup for the Combined Universities, making four appearances.

In 1987, he made seven first-class appearances for the university, taking 18 wickets at an average of 41.33, with best figures of 5/97, which came in The University Match at Lord's against Oxford University. In List A cricket, he made four appearances for the Combined Universities in the Benson & Hedges Cup. In his final year of studies in 1988, Scott made three first-class appearances, against Surrey, Essex and Middlesex, taking 11 wickets at an average of 35.00, with best figures of 4/66. He appeared in six List A matches for the Combined Universities in the 1988 Benson & Hedges Cup, playing his final match in that format against Essex. In total, he made 26 first-class appearances for the university, taking in his role as a bowler, 70 wickets at an average of 38.14. He was less successful in List A cricket for the Combined Universities, taking just 8 wickets in fourteen matches, which came at an average of 52.25, with best figures of 2/32. He gained a Blue in cricket during his time at Cambridge.

References

External links
Alastair Scott at ESPNcricinfo
Alastair Scott at CricketArchive

1966 births
Living people
Sportspeople from Guildford
Alumni of the University of Cambridge
English cricketers
Cambridge University cricketers
Sussex cricketers
British Universities cricketers
Oxford and Cambridge Universities cricketers